Azu Mountain, is a  mountain in the Hart Ranges of the Northern Rockies of British Columbia.  The mountain is situated approximately 27 kilometres southwest of Mackenzie, British Columbia.  The name is an abbreviation of the nearby Azouzetta Lake and was officially adopted on March 26th, 1985.  The Azu Bowl is a popular local ski touring area and is easily accessible from the adjacent Powder King Mountain Resort. 

Precipitation and snow melt runoff drains into Declier Creek to the south and the Pine River to the north.

References 

Northern Interior of British Columbia
One-thousanders of British Columbia
Canadian Rockies
Cariboo Land District